XHPCZA-FM is a radio station on 88.3 FM in Zacatlán, Puebla, Mexico, serving Zacatlán and Chignahuapan. The station is owned by Daniel Carlos Cázares Álvarez and is known as La Magnífica with a grupera format.

History
XHPCZA was awarded in the IFT-4 radio auction of 2017 to Óscar Mario Beteta Vallejo for 796,000 pesos, but the station went through three different winning bidders who refused to pay for the station. Detochomorocho Producciones was the original winning bidder but refused to pay the price of 11 million pesos. Two further bidders, Corporación Sonitel and Sak Telecom, did not pay up. The award of XHPCZA's concession to Beteta Vallejo marked the end of the IFT-4 auction.

XHPCZA signed on in 2019 as the first commercial radio station in Zacatlán. It was sold by Beteta to Daniel Carlos Cázares Álvarez in 2021.

XHPCZA joined XELFFS-AM 980 in Izúcar de Matamoros as a franchised La Magnífica station.

References

External links

Radio stations in Puebla
Radio stations established in 2019
2019 establishments in Mexico